The Philippines Central Conference of the United Methodist Church (Filipino: Kumperensyang Sentral ng Pilipinas) is a collection of annual conferences of the United Methodist Church in the Philippines that are organised much like juridictonal conferences in the United States. The Philippines Central Conference is considered a member church of the World Methodist Council, and a "Central Conference" of the world-wide United Methodist Church. It is also a member of the Christian Conference of Asia and the National Council of Churches in the Philippines as The United Methodist Church in the Philippines, representing the denomination as its Philippine counterpart.

The Philippines Central Conference is further subdivided into twenty-two (22) regions, called annual conferences, under the authorities of three episcopal areas. These annual conferences are subdivided into "districts," which provide further administrative functions for the operation of local churches in cooperation with each other under the supervision of the district superintendent. This structure is vital to Methodism, and is referred to as "connexionalism".

The Philippines Central Conference has a professing membership of about 200,540, but it serves a much larger community of close to 1 million. From six annual conferences in 1968, the United Methodist Church in the Philippines has grown to 19 annual conferences located in three episcopal areas. And now, with 24 Annual conferences.

History
The first Methodist presence on the islands was that of Rev. Maj. George C. Stull, a minister from the Montana Annual Conference, which was a part of the Methodist Episcopal Church. He originally went to the Philippines as the chaplain of the First Montana Regiment, and established the first ME church. In the Stull letter—a correspondence sent from Stull to his home conference for the annual conference—Stull enumerates several of his accomplishments since coming to the islands. Among them is the fact that he commissioned the first Filipino to preach using his "elder's privilege in an emergency."

In 1908, the General Conference of the Methodist Episcopal Church authorized the organization of the Philippine Islands Mission into the Philippine Islands Annual Conference, under the jurisdiction of the Southern Asia Central Conference.

The work in the Philippines grew quickly and in 1936, the General Conference enabled the organization of the Philippines Central Conference during the following quadrennium. This act was ratified at the 1939 Uniting Conference which created The Methodist Church. The first session of the Philippines Central Conference was held at the Central Methodist Church in Manila, beginning February 29, 1940.

Following years of growth, the 1960 General Conference approved a second episcopal area in the Philippines Central Conference: the Baguio Area (composed of the Northwest Philippines Annual Conference, the Northern Philippines Annual Conference, and the Mindanao Provisional Annual Conference) which joined the Manila Area (composed of the Philippines Annual Conference, Southwest Philippines Provisional Annual Conference, and the Middle Philippines Annual Conference). The 1984 General Conference mandated the addition of a third episcopal area, the Davao Area.

In 2022 Ruby-Nell Estrella was elected as the first woman bishop of the United Methodist Church in the Philippines. (The Philippines Central Conference is also a member of the Christian Conference of Asia and the National Council of Churches in the Philippines as The United Methodist Church in the Philippines, representing the denomination as its Philippine counterpart.)

List of Episcopal Areas

Baguio Episcopal Area 
Bishop Pedro M. Torio, Jr., OD, OSL
114,583 Professing and Baptized Members, 639 Organized Churches, 38 Preaching Places, 310 Ordained Elders, 380 Local Pastors. The geographical areas covers 447,229 square kilometers. This area also handles the Nepal District.

Davao Episcopal Area
Bishop Rodolfo A. Juan
25,396 Professing and Baptized Members, 127 Ordained Clergy, 143 local Pastors, 201 Organized Churches, and 40 Preaching places. This Episcopal area covers an area of 3000,000 square Kilometers.

Manila Episcopal Area 
Bishop Ciriaco Francisco
143,329 Professing and Baptized Members, 534 Organized churches, 208 Preaching places, 392 Ordained Elders, 360 local pastors. The geographical area covers around 300,000 square kilometers.

List of Annual Conferences

Baguio Episcopal Area
Central Luzon Philippines Annual Conference
North Central Philippines Annual Conference
Northeast Philippines Annual Conference
Northern Philippines Annual Conference
Northwest Philippines Annual Conference
Pangasinan Philippines Annual Conference
Hundred Islands Philippines Annual Conference
Tarlac Philippines Annual Conference
Northeast Luzon Philippines Annual Conference

Davao Episcopal Area
East Mindanao Philippines Annual Conference
Mindanao Philippines Annual Conference
Northwest Mindanao Philippines Annual Conference
Visayas Philippines Annual Conference
Bicol Philippines Annual Conference

Manila Episcopal Area
Bulacan Philippines Annual Conference
Middle Philippines Annual Conference
Palawan Philippines Annual Conference
Philippines Annual Conference
Rizal Philippines Annual Conference East
Pampanga Philippines Annual Conference
West Middle Philippines Annual Conference
Southwest Philippines Annual Conference
Cavite Philippines Annual Conference
Quezon City Philippines Annual Conference East
Southern Tagalog Philippines Provisional Annual Conference East
South Nueva Ecija Philippines Annual Conference

Ministry Fellowships
 United Methodist Youth Fellowship (UMYF), for youth ages 13 to 24 years old.
In National level, it is known United Methodist Youth Fellowship in the Philippines (UMYFP)
 United Methodist Young Adult Fellowship (UMYAF), for 25 to 40 years old.
In National level, United Methodist Young Adult Fellowship in the Philippines (UMYAFP)
 United Methodist Men (UMM), for men with ages 36 years old and above.
 United Methodist Women's Society of Christian Service (UMWSCS), for women with ages 36 years old and above.

Other special group fellowships
 United Methodist Elderly Fellowship
 United Methodist Church Workers’ Fellowship
 United Methodist Clergy Spouses’ Association
 United Methodist Preachers’ Kids Association

See also
 Methodism
 Protestantism in the Philippines
 Conferences of the United Methodist Church
 Philippine Methodist Church
 Ang Iglesia Metodista sa Pilipinas

References

External links
Philippine Methodism (Pinoy Metodista Online) - United Methodist Church in the Philippines
Official website of The UMC - Baguio Episcopal Area
Baguio Episcopal Area UMC

United Methodist Annual Conferences
Methodism in the Philippines